Majri Kalan is a village in Behror tehsil, Alwar district, in the state of Rajasthan, India. It is on National Highway No.8, 10 km from Neemrana.

References

Villages in Alwar district